Pongalur N. Palanisamy is a politician from the Indian state of Tamil Nadu. He is former minister for rural industries and animal husbandry in the Government of Tamil Nadu and a member of the Dravida Munnetra Kazhagam (DMK) party. He was born in Erode district on 3 August 1948.

Political career 
Age 76 
 1971–1976, Member of Tamil Nadu Legislative Assembly for  Pongalur
1991–2011, Coimbatore DMK District Secretary.
 1996–2001, Minister for forests, pollution control, sports & animal husbandry.  	
 2006–2011, Minister for Rural Industries & Animal Husbandry
 2006–2011, Member of Tamil Nadu Legislative Assembly for Coimbatore East

Elections contested

References 

1948 births
Living people
Dravida Munnetra Kazhagam politicians
State cabinet ministers of Tamil Nadu
People from Erode district
Tamil Nadu MLAs 1996–2001
Tamil Nadu MLAs 2006–2011